Allen Quay (January 3, 1936 — March 22, 2016) was an American tennis player.

Quay, the 1954 Orange Bowl champion, was a U.S junior Davis Cup representative and ranked as high as fourth in the country in the junior tennis. In 1955 he reached the singles third round of the U.S. National Championships, losing to the fifth-seeded Eddie Moylan. He captained the University of Miami in varsity tennis.

References

External links
 
 

1936 births
2016 deaths
American male tennis players
Miami Hurricanes men's tennis players
Tennis people from New York (state)
People from Brockport, New York